Hojagarawul Sanctuary is a sanctuary (zakaznik) of Turkmenistan and a part of Köýtendag Nature Reserve.

Sites

Karlyuk Cave 
An underground network of ~50 km. of caves, it contains numerous subterranean lakes home to the endemic Starostin's loach.

Kainar Baba 
One of the few hot sulfide springs in Turkmenistan, this is a popular bathing spot.

External links
 https://web.archive.org/web/20090609072344/http://natureprotection.gov.tm/reserve_tm.html
 https://whc.unesco.org/en/tentativelists/5436/

References 

Sanctuaries in Turkmenistan